Curtitoma conoidea is a species of sea snail, a marine gastropod mollusk in the family Mangeliidae.

Description
The length of the shell varies between 8.5 mm and 15 mm.

The white shell is narrow and with a long spire. It contains 7 whorls, convex, without carina. The plications are slight, somewhat sigmoid, almost obsolete on the body whorl: everywhere covered with moderately strong revolving striae.

Distribution
This species occurs in European waters off arctic Norway and Russia; on the continental shelf of the Alaskan Beaufort Sea.

References

 Sars, G.O. (1878) Mollusca regionis arcticae Norvegiae. Oversigt over de I Norges arktiskes region forekommende Bloddyr. Bidrag til kundskaben om Norges arktiske fauna. 1, 466 pp. Christiania
 Bogdanov I. (1990). Mollusks of Oenopotinae Subfamily (Gastropoda, Pectinibranchia, Turridae) in the seas of the USSR. Leningrad 221 p
 Gofas, S.; Le Renard, J.; Bouchet, P. (2001). Mollusca, in: Costello, M.J. et al. (Ed.) (2001). European register of marine species: a check-list of the marine species in Europe and a bibliography of guides to their identification. Collection Patrimoines Naturels, 50: pp. 180–213

External links
  Tucker, J.K. 2004 Catalog of recent and fossil turrids (Mollusca: Gastropoda). Zootaxa 682: 1–1295.
 Nekhaev, Ivan O. "Marine shell-bearing Gastropoda of Murman (Barents Sea): an annotated check-list." Ruthenica 24.2 (2014): 75

conoidea
Gastropods described in 1878